George Edward Johnson (1 May 1924 – 19 July 1985) was a New Zealand representative rower.

At the 1950 British Empire Games he won the gold medal as part of the men's coxed four. At the 1952 Summer Olympics he competed as part of the coxed four again, but the crew did not make the final.

References

1924 births
1985 deaths
New Zealand male rowers
Olympic rowers of New Zealand
Rowers at the 1952 Summer Olympics
Rowers at the 1950 British Empire Games
Commonwealth Games gold medallists for New Zealand
Commonwealth Games medallists in rowing
Medallists at the 1950 British Empire Games